Jung Yoo-jin (born February 19, 1989), also known as Eugene Jung, is a South Korean model and actress.

Career 
She started her career as a model at YG Entertainment.

She is known for her roles in Korean dramas, such as Heard It Through the Grapevine (2015), Moorim School, W and Snowdrop.

In February 2018, Jung signed with new management agency FNC Entertainment. On March 3, 2022, Jung's contract with FNC Entertainment has expired recently.

Filmography

Film

Television series

Television show

Music video

Awards & nominations

References 

1989 births
Living people
South Korean child actresses
South Korean female models
South Korean film actresses
South Korean television actresses
South Korean web series actresses